The rufous beaked snake (Rhamphiophis oxyrhynchus) is a species of mildly venomous snake in the family Psammophiidae. The species is native to East Africa. Its common name refers to its hooked snout, which it uses to dig burrows, and to its reddish-brown dorsal coloration. It hunts small animals during the day with the help of its venomous bite.

Taxonomy
The two subspecies are R.o. oxyrhynchus (J.T. Reinhardt, 1843) and R.o. rostratus W. Peters, 1854. Some authorities consider the latter to be a species, R. rostratus W. Peters, 1854.

Description
It has a shortened skull, as with all beaked snakes, giving it a clear distinction between its head and body, as well as a dark brown eye stripe running down the side of its head. Its eyes are large with round pupils. Its back ranges from grey to yellowish-brown to reddish-brown, and its belly is cream or yellowish-white.

Geographic range
The rufous beaked snake's range includes north Botswana, north Zimbabwe, Mozambique, Tanzania, Uganda, Kenya, South Sudan, and Sudan,

Habitat
It primarily inhabits bushveld and thornveld (bushland) habitats.

Biology
Diurnal animals, rufous beaked snakes hunt small animals, including other snakes, but stay in burrows during the hottest part of the day. The snake's venom, one of its components of which is a neurotoxin called rufoxin, causes hypotension and circulatory shock in small mammals, but is not dangerous to humans.

References

rufous beaked snake
Snakes of Africa
Fauna of East Africa
rufous beaked snake